Bishambhar Nath Pande (23 December 1906 – 1 June 1998) was a freedom fighter, social worker, and parliamentarian in India. Pande devoted his life to the cause of national integration, and to the spread of the Gandhian way of life.

Life
B. N. Pande was a member of the Indian National Congress and a close associate of Jawaharlal Nehru, the first prime minister of the Republic of India, as well as of Indira Gandhi, Rajiv Gandhi and Sonia Gandhi. He pursued a Gandhian philosophy and was for 18 years vice-chairman of the Gandhi Smriti and Darshan Samiti (GSDS), which aims to spread Gandhian principles and philosophy globally.

Pande gave lectures in countries such as Japan, Russia, Germany and Canada on the life and ideals of Mohandas K. Gandhi.

Awards
In 1976, Pande was awarded the Padma Shri for his achievements in the field of social work.

Pande was awarded the Indira Gandhi Award for National Integration by P. V. Narasimha Rao (the Prime Minister of India) in 1996 for his lifetime achievements in the field of Hindu-Muslim unity in India.  He was also awarded the Khuda Baksh Award for his work on the composite culture of India.

Political career
Member of the Legislative Assembly, Uttar Pradesh
Mayor of Allahabad
Member of Parliament in the Rajya Sabha (upper house), 1976 to 1984 and 1989 to 1998
President of the Pradesh Congress Committee, Uttar Pradesh, 1980 to 1983
Governor of Odisha, 1984 to 1988

Books
Pande devoted a major part of his life to research on secularism with the objective of promoting unity amongst all religions in India. As part of his research, he wrote several books, including:

Centenary history of the Indian National Congress 1885–1985
A Concise History of the Indian National Congress, 1947–1985 (1986)
Indira Gandhi
Islam and Indian culture
Aurangzeb

Family
Pande was married to Shanta Pande, a former freedom fighter.  He had one child, Nandita Rao (wife of Joginder Singh Rao), and two grandchildren, Probir and Rahul Rao. He also has four granddaughters.

References

External links
 https://openlibrary.org/b/OL162611M/B.N.-Pande-messenger-of-harmony
 http://www.iosworld.org/ebk7.htm 
 http://www.publicationsdivision.nic.in/Eng-Pub/Au-Wise/EB27.HTM 
 http://www.islamcan.com/islamic-history/muslim-rule-in-india.shtml

Indian National Congress politicians from Uttar Pradesh
Governors of Odisha
Members of the Uttar Pradesh Legislative Assembly
Rajya Sabha members from Uttar Pradesh
1906 births
1998 deaths
Mayors of Allahabad
Indian independence activists from Uttar Pradesh
Recipients of the Padma Shri in social work
Nominated members of the Rajya Sabha
20th-century Indian politicians
20th-century Indian educators
Educators from Uttar Pradesh
Indian political writers
20th-century Indian biographers
Social workers from Uttar Pradesh